Doris Emerson Chapman (1903 – 1990) was a British artist and prehistorian.  She trained in Paris and then exhibited paintings in London during the 1920s and 1930s.  She was associated with the Bloomsbury Group, having an affair with Adrian Stephen.  She then joined the Morven Institute of Archeological Research to draw the megaliths of Avebury and produced measured drawings of the megaliths as they were excavated.  She also pioneered in artistic facial reconstruction from skulls.

She married the director, Alexander Keiller, in 1938 but soon divorced when the Second World War broke out and the Institute closed.  She became a nurse in London and then married again in 1951.

What little has been written about her in her lifetime has mostly been about her looks and love affairs.

References

1903 births
1990 deaths
British women archaeologists
British archaeologists
Prehistorians
English painters
Bloomsbury Group
20th-century archaeologists
British expatriates in France